The federal Small Business Health Options Program is an insurance exchange, created by Patient Protection and Affordable Care Act (Obamacare). The Small Business Health Options Program (SHOP) Marketplace helps small businesses to provide health coverage to their employees. Therefore, it is open to employers with 50 or fewer full-time equivalent employees (FTEs), in which it also includes non-profit organizations.

According to the HealthCare.gov, the benefit of SHOP Marketplace includes allowing owners to offer health and dental coverage to employees. Other than that, with flexibility, choice, and the online application and account management, SHOP aims to meets the needs of the business owner and its employees.

In 2015 Employee Choice was introduced under of the PPACA's Small Business Health Options Program (SHOP) Marketplace.  While SHOP was available for 2014, this is the first year that small employers in 14 states can apply online. Before 2015 employers who provided health insurance to their employees typically worked with an  insurance broker and one health insurance company. In 2015, they however can offer their employees a choice of insurance companies.

SHOP enrollment is available  any time of the year - there is no "Open Enrollment" limitation.  Employers who wish to contribute to the premium cost of their employees may qualify to receive a SHOP tax credit. The tax credit is worth up to 50% of employer's contribution toward its employees' premium costs. It will be up to 35% for tax-exempt employers. Unfortunately, employees can't join the plan after the initial enrollment period unless they are new hires and qualify Special Enrollment Period.

According to the HealthCare.gov, special Enrollment Period refers to a time outside of the open enrollment period, in which you and your family have a right to sign up for health coverage. In other words, you qualify for a special enrollment period 60 days following certain life events, including but limited to: change in family status such as marriage or birth of a child, change in income or address, or loss of other health coverage through unemployment or divorce.

However, SHOP Marketplace is not offered to self-employed individuals, with no employees. Instead, they are essentially in the same position as unemployed persons who must turn to the Health Insurance Marketplace for coverage.

As of March 13, 2015, the United States Department of Health and Human Services claims, evidence has shown that the SHOP marketplace is working in terms of affordability. For taxpayers, they are benefiting as the health costs and spending have decreased last year. With a historic slow down in the growth of health care costs, workers, business and taxpayers are able to generate savings under the introduction of SHOP.

References

External links
 SHOP Coverage for Employers
 SHOP Marketplace basics for employers

Affordable Care Act
Health Options Program